Mycolicibacter nonchromogenicus (formerly Mycobacterium nonchromogenicum) is an infectious species of bacteria.

References

External links
Type strain of M. nonchromogenicus at BacDive -  the Bacterial Diversity Metadatabase

Acid-fast bacilli
nonchromogenicum
Bacteria described in 1965